The  is an electric multiple unit (EMU) train type operated in Japan by the private railway operator Hankyu Railway since 1989.

Formations
As of 1 April 2012, the fleet consisted of ten eight-car sets and nine two-car sets. Some of the two-car sets are semi-permanently coupled with 6-car 7000 series sets. Six-car sets were also operated initially, but these were subsequently lengthened to become eight-car sets.

8-car sets

 The "Mc1" and "M1" cars are each fitted with two scissors-type pantographs.
 The "Mc1" and "M1" cars of set 8008 are each fitted with two single-arm pantographs.
 Car 5 of set 8020 is numbered 8670 (type T8550), and car 6 is numbered 8790 (type T8750).
 Cars 7 and 8 of sets 8002 to 8007 include transverse seating.

2-car sets

Sets 8030 to 8035

 Sets 8031, 8032, and 8035 are semi-permanently coupled with 6-car 7000 series sets.
 The "Mc1" cars are fitted with two scissors-type pantographs.
 Sets from 8033 onward have a modified front end design.

Sets 8040 to 8042

The "Mc1" cars are fitted with two single-arm pantographs.

References

Electric multiple units of Japan
8000 series
Train-related introductions in 1988
1500 V DC multiple units of Japan
Alna Koki rolling stock